Charles William Holbech, J.P.  (born Farnborough, Warwickshire 1816; died 1901) was Archdeacon of Coventry from 1873 until 1887.

Holbech was educated at Eton and Balliol College, Oxford. He was ordained in 1840, and was curate at Chelsfield until 1842; and  Vicar of Farnborough, Warwickshire from 1842 to 1896.

He died on 20 March 1901.

References

1816 births
1901 deaths
People from Warwickshire
19th-century English Anglican priests
20th-century English Anglican priests
Alumni of Balliol College, Oxford
Archdeacons of Coventry
People educated at Eton College